Laura Pigossi and Nadia Podoroska were the defending champions, but both players chose not to participate.

Kotomi Takahata and Prarthana Thombare won the title after Ulrikke Eikeri and Tereza Mrdeža retired in the final at 1–0.

Seeds

Draw

References
Main Draw

XIXO Ladies Open Hódmezővásárhely - Doubles